Bradfield Combust with Stanningfield is a civil parish about 6 miles south of Bury St Edmunds, in the West Suffolk district of Suffolk, England.

According to the 2001 census it had a population of 503, increasing to 578 at the Census 2011. The parish was formed in 1998 from Bradfield Combust and Stanningfield.

References

External links 
 Bradfield Combust with Stanningfield Parish Council
 Suffolk Churches

Civil parishes in Suffolk
Borough of St Edmundsbury